The Philadelphia Wings are a lacrosse team based in Philadelphia, Pennsylvania playing in the National Lacrosse League (NLL). The 2010 season was the 24th in franchise history.

Regular season

Conference standings

Game log
Reference:

Transactions

New players
 Dan Teat - acquired in trade
 Mike Ward - acquired in trade

Players not returning
 Sean Thomson - traded

Trades

Entry draft
The 2009 NLL Entry Draft took place on September 9, 2008. The Wings selected the following players:

Roster

See also
2010 NLL season

References

Philadelphia
Phil